The Championship is the Football League Championship (a division in British [international-rules] football, or in American usage, "soccer").

The Championship also may refer to:
 British football highlights television  program, 2004–2009, also called Championship Goals (and formally so named for 5 months)
 Scottish Championship, the second division of the Scottish Professional Football League formerly known as Scottish Division One.
 British rugby football:
 RFU Championship (rugby union)
 Championship (rugby league)
 The Rugby Championship, Southern Hemisphere rugby union competition

See also 
 Championship